Holy Trinity is a tram stop on the Nottingham Express Transit (NET) network in the City of Nottingham suburb of Clifton. It takes its name from the nearby Holy Trinity Church. It is situated on a short stretch of reserved track at the junction of Southchurch Drive and Farnborough Road, and comprises a pair of side platforms flanking the running tracks. The stop is on line 2 of the NET, from Clifton via the city centre to Phoenix Park. Trams run at frequencies that vary between 4 and 8 trams per hour, depending on the day and time of day.

Holy Trinity stop opened on 25 August 2015, along with the rest of NET's phase two.

References

External links

Nottingham Express Transit stops
Clifton, Nottinghamshire